The Schottenstein Prize in Cardiovascular Sciences is awarded biennially to physicians or biomedical scientists who are judged to have made extraordinary and sustained contributions to improving cardiovascular health. The award is worth US$100,000 and is conferred by The Ohio State University Wexner Medical Center’s Heart and Vascular Center.

Laureates

See also

 List of medicine awards

References

Medicine awards
American science and technology awards